The American Line was a shipping company founded in 1871 and based in Philadelphia, Pennsylvania.  It began as part of the Pennsylvania Railroad, although the railroad got out of the shipping business soon after founding the company. In 1902, it became part of the International Navigation Co., with the American Line generally handling traffic between the United States ports of Philadelphia and New York City and the British ports of Liverpool and Southampton. Sister company Red Star Line handled traffic between America and the European continent, primarily through Antwerp, Belgium. The company's most prominent president was Clement Griscom, who led the company from 1888 to 1902 and worked as a company executive for its entire existence. During its existence, the company was the largest American shipping company, rivalled only by the smaller, Baltimore-based Atlantic Transport Lines, although this distinction is a marginal one, as all American oceanic shipping concerns were dwarfed by British companies such as the  White Star Line or Cunard Line and German ones such as HAPAG.

The company became much larger when it bought out the Inman Line in 1886. In 1902, Griscom decided to merge his company with several other lines to create the International Mercantile Marine Company. The American name continued to exist under the IMM banner, but it was not until the trust's failure in 1932 that the American pieces of the combine were once again solely under the American flag, this time in the guise of United States Lines.

Ships
, chartered to the Red Star Line 1895–1898 for seven voyages

 (also sailed as USS Yale, SS Philadelphia, and USS Harrisburg)
, chartered to the Red Star Line 1901–1902 for four voyages
, Haverford's sister ship, torpedoed and sunk in 1915 while acting as a decoy "battlecruiser"
, chartered to the Red Star Line 1886–1897
, chartered to the Red Star Line 1889
, chartered to the Red Star Line 1895–1903
, purchased from the Red Star Line in 1923, then sold to Panama Pacific Line
, chartered from American Line 1887–1897
Pittsburgh,  chartered to the Red Star Line 1925–1926. Sold to the RSL 1926 and renamed Pennland, sold to Bernstein Red Star Line, Hamburg 1935

, chartered to the Red Star Line 1895–1903

References

General references

Flayhart, William Henry III (2000).  The American Line 1871-1902 (New York, W.W. Norton & Co.),

External links 

 American Line History and Ephemera GG Archives

Defunct shipping companies of the United States
Companies based in Philadelphia
Defunct companies based in Pennsylvania